= England under-19 =

England under-19 may refer to:

- English U-19 cricket team
- England national under-19 football team
